Uroš Velepec (born 17 May 1967) is a Slovenian biathlete. He competed at the 1992 Winter Olympics and the 1994 Winter Olympics.

References

1967 births
Living people
Slovenian male biathletes
Olympic biathletes of Slovenia
Biathletes at the 1992 Winter Olympics
Biathletes at the 1994 Winter Olympics
People from Upper Carniola
20th-century Slovenian people